The Esports World Federation (EWSF) is a Philippine-based international organization that serves as an umbrella body for international federations in electronic sports (esports) and digital sports and other game genres across the world.

Founded in 2018, the federation's mission is to declare the Philippines as a center of esports in the country, to being the sole governing body of esports in the world and to support the game developers, software companies and players who are participating in the events being run by ESWF.

According to its website, the strategic plan of the federation is to encourage and support the formation of international esport genre governing bodies, holding World Cup for Esports once every two years and World Championships yearly, holding the esports summit, training and certification coaches for those who are interested in the sport. EWSF has also partnered with Philippine-based collegiate sports leagues the Federation of School Sports Associations of the Philippines, the Philippine Collegiate Champions League and the Philippine Inter Schools, Colleges and Universities Athletic Association and international federations in executing their plans, among them is the strengthening of the grassroots program and school-based tournaments.

In 2021, ESWF signed a memorandum of understanding with the International Esports Federation for the unification of all esports organizations and the development of the sport through the esports For All Commission.

Members
Amateur Europe Esports Federation
Americas Esports Federation Organization
Asia Pacific Electronic Sports Confederation 
Digital Cock Boxing
Esports World Federation Pan American
International Digital Invasion Confederation
International Digital Motor Sports Federation
International Federation of Esports and Digital Sports University
International Federation of Esports Battle Royale
International Federation of Esports Coaches
International Federation of Esports FPS
International Federation of Esports Fighting Game KO
International Federation of Esports Healthcare Professionals
International Federation of Esports MOBA
International Federation of Esports RTS
International Federation of Esports – Mmorpg
ESports Career and Pathways
Organization of African Electronic Sports
World Digital Combat Sports Federation
YeSports Asia

References

External links

International sports organizations
Esports governing bodies
Sports organizations established in 2018
2018 establishments in the Philippines
Esports in the Philippines